John Balthasar Brungardt (born July 10, 1958) is an American prelate of the Roman Catholic Church, serving as bishop of the Diocese of Dodge City in Kansas since 2010.

Biography

Early life and education
John Brungardt was born on July 10, 1958 in Salina, Kansas to Francis Balthasar and Virginia (née Burton) Brungardt, one of six brothers and sisters in a Catholic family.  He chose Saint Joseph as his confirmation saint, considering him a role model for Catholic men and boys.  Brungardt graduated from Benedictine College in Atchison, Kansas, with a Bachelor of Science degree in physics with a minor in mathematics in 1980.

Brungardt furthered his studies at Iowa State University in Ames, Iowa, earning a Master of Science degree in physics in 1983, and at Kansas State University in Manhattan, Kansas, earning a Doctor of Philosophy degree in curriculum and instruction.  In 1985, Brungardt started his "first career" as a science and computers teacher in Wichita, Kansas, teaching at Wichita Collegiate School and then at Kapaun Mt. Carmel High School. In 1990, Brungardt's mother died, causing him to go through a spiritual reawakening.  He then entered priestly formation at Pontifical College Josephinum in Columbus, Ohio.  Brungardt earned a Master of Divinity degree and a Master of Arts degree in Moral Theology in 1998.

Ordination and ministry
Brungardt was ordained a priest for the Diocese of Wichita by Bishop Eugene Gerber at the Cathedral of the Immaculate Conception in Wichita on May 23, 1998.  As a diocesan priest, he served numerous assignments, including chaplain and religion teacher at Bishop Carroll Catholic High School in Wichita, director of the office of respect life and social justice, and pastor of seven different parishes. In 2003, Brungardt spent five months in Mexico, studying Spanish language and Mexican culture.  From 2005 until 2010, he was chancellor of the diocese and moderator of the diocesan Office of Hispanic Ministry.

Bishop of Dodge City
In November 2010, Pope Benedict XVI appointed Brungardt as the sixth bishop of Dodge City, replacing Bishop Ronald Gilmore.  On February 2, 2011, Brungardt was consecrated by Archbishop Joseph Naumann, at the Cathedral of Our Lady of Guadalupe in Dodge City, with Bishops Michael Jackels and Ronald Gilmore acting as co-consecrators.

Brungardt chose his episcopal motto, "Filled With Compassion", from the story of the Prodigal Son in the Gospel of Luke.  The left side of his coat of arms is the shield of the Diocese of Wichita.  The right side is divided into two halves.  The superior side features a sun.  The lower half features a rose.

On February 9, 2021, the Kansas Bureau of Investigation notified Brungardt that he was under investigation for of sexual abuse of a minor.  Denying the accusations, he immediately suspended his episcopal duties and the Vatican instructed Archbishop Joseph Naumann to start an canonical investigation.  Bishop Gerald Vincke was appointed as apostolic administrator to run the diocese during the investigation.  Brungardt was cleared of the accusation against him by the Congregation for the Doctrine of the Faith on March 23, 2022 as announced by Naumann.  There were no criminal charges.

See also

 Catholic Church hierarchy
 Catholic Church in the United States
 Historical list of the Catholic bishops of the United States
 List of Catholic bishops of the United States
 Lists of patriarchs, archbishops, and bishops

References

External links
Roman Catholic Diocese of Dodge City Home Page
 https://www.kansas.com/news/state/article249101570.html

Episcopal succession

 

People from Salina, Kansas
Roman Catholic Diocese of Wichita
Roman Catholic bishops of Dodge City
21st-century Roman Catholic bishops in the United States
1958 births
Living people